The 2019–20 season was 8th season in the top Ukrainian football league for FC Oleksandriya. Oleksandriya competed in Premier League, Ukrainian Cup and UEFA Europa League.

Players

Squad information

Transfers

In

Out

Pre-season and friendlies

Competitions

Overall

Premier League

League table

Results summary

Results by round

Matches

Play-off round

Ukrainian Cup

UEFA Europa League

Group stage

Statistics

Appearances and goals

|-
! colspan=16 style=background:#dcdcdc; text-align:center| Goalkeepers

|-
! colspan=16 style=background:#dcdcdc; text-align:center| Defenders

|-
! colspan=16 style=background:#dcdcdc; text-align:center| Midfielders

|-
! colspan=16 style=background:#dcdcdc; text-align:center| Forwards

|-
! colspan=16 style=background:#dcdcdc; text-align:center| Players transferred out during the season

Last updated: 25 July 2020

Goalscorers

Last updated: 25 July 2020

Clean sheets

Last updated: 25 July 2020

Disciplinary record

Last updated: 19 July 2020

Attendances

Last updated: 25 July 2020

References

External links
 Official website

FC Oleksandriya
Oleksandriya
Oleksandriya